Éve Lamoureux (born 10 July 1987) is a Canadian synchronized swimmer who competed in the 2008 Summer Olympics.

References

1987 births
Living people
Canadian synchronized swimmers
Olympic synchronized swimmers of Canada
Synchronized swimmers at the 2008 Summer Olympics
World Aquatics Championships medalists in synchronised swimming
Synchronized swimmers at the 2009 World Aquatics Championships